This is a list of compositions by the Franco-American composer Betsy Jolas (born 1926). Her music is published by Éditions Alphonse Leduc, Éditions Billaudot and Éditions Salabert, amongst others.

Opera and stage works
Le Pavillon au Bord de la Rivière (1975), chamber opera in 4 acts
Schliemann (1982–83), opera in 3 acts
Le Cyclope (1986), chamber opera in 1 act

Ajax (1960), incidental music for the play by Sophocles
Les troyennes (1961), incidental music for the play by Euripides
La dernière existence au camp de Tatenberg, incidental music for the play by Armand Gatti

Orchestra
D'un opéra de voyage (1967) for chamber orchestra
Quatre Plages (1967) for string orchestra
Well Met (1973) for string orchestra
Tales of a summer sea (1977) for orchestra
Cinq pièces pour Boulogne (1982) (2 versions)
Just a Minute! (1986)
Well Met 04 – Pantomime for 12 strings (2004)
B Day (2006) for symphony orchestra
A Little Summer Suite (2015)
Well Met Suite (2016)

Solo works with orchestra or ensemble
Points D'Aube (1968) for viola and ensemble
Musique d'hiver (1971) for organ and small orchestra
États (1967) for violin and 6 percussionists
Trois Rencontres (1973) for solo string trio and symphony orchestra
How-Now (1973) for 8 instruments
Onze Lieder (1977) for trumpet and chamber orchestra
Stances (1978) for piano and orchestra
Points d'or (1982) for saxophonist (playing soprano, alto, tenor, baritone) and 15 instruments
Frauenleben (1992) for viola and orchestra
Lumor, 7 Lieder spirituels for a saxophonist (playing soprano and tenor) and orchestra (1996)
Petite symphonie concertante (1997) for conducting violin and orchestra
Wanderlied (2003) for cello and 15 instruments
Histoires Vraies (2015) for trumpet and orchestra
Side Roads (2017) for cello and strings

Works for large ensemble
Figures (1965) for 9 instruments
J.D.E. (1966) for 14 musicians
D'un opéra de poupée en sept musiques (1982) for 11 instruments
Préludes, Fanfares, Interludes, Sonneries (1983) for wind band
Sonate à 8 (1998) for cello octet

Chamber music
Sonate à Trois (1956) for recorder, viola da gamba and harpsichord
Quartet No. 1 (1956)
Quartet No. 3, 9 études for string quartet (1973)
O Wall (1976) for wind quintet
Trio (1988) for piano trio
Quartet No. 4 – Menus Propos (1989) for string quartet
Trio "Les Heures" (1991) for string trio
Musique pour Xavier (1993) for clarinet, tenor saxophone and violin
Quartet No. 5 (1994) for string quartet
Music for here (1994) for solo bassoon with accompaniment of viola and cello
Quartet No. 6 (1997) for clarinet and string trio
Petite sonnerie de juin (1997) for horn, trumpet and trombone
Trio sopra et sola facta (1999–2000) for violin, clarinet and piano
Titivillus (2000) for mezzo-soprano, flute and piano or 2 flutes and piano
Ah! Haydn (2007) for piano trio
Quatuor VII (Afterthoughts) (2018) for trumpet, violin, viola and cello

Duos
Trifolium (1947) for flute and piano
Remember (1971) for cor anglais (or viola) and cello
Four Duos (1978) for viola and piano
Trois études campanaires (1980) for carillon and keyboard
Quatre pièces en marge (1983) for cello and piano
Three Duos (1983) for tuba and piano
Music for Joan (1988) for vibraphone and piano
Petites musiques de chevet (1989) for clarinet and piano
E.A petite suite variée (1991) for trumpet in C and vibraphone
Études aperçues (1992) for vibraphone and 5 cow bells
Musique pour Delphine (1992) for violin and cello
Quoth the raven, 3 pieces for clarinet and piano (1993)
Frauenleben (1994) for viola and piano
Music to go (1995) for viola and cello
Come follow (2001) for bassoon and viola
Lovemusic (2005) for flute and bass clarinet
Suite: Puer apud magistros exercentur (2007) for 2 alto saxophones
Allô! for 2 saxophones
Oh là! for 2 saxophones
Scat for 2 saxophones
Ardente for viola and piano
Femme le soir (2018) for cello and piano

Solo works
Episode No. 1 (1964) for flute
Fusain (1971) for bass flute and piccolo
Chanson d'approche (1972) for piano
Autour (1972) for harpsichord
B for Sonata (1973) for piano
Scion (1973) for cello
Tranche (1976) for harp
Musique de jour (1976) for organ
Episode No. 2 "ohne Worte" (1977) for flute
Auprès (1980) for harpsichord
Pièce pour Saint Germain (1981) for piano
Calling E.C. (1982) for piano or two pianos
Episode No. 3 (1982) for trumpet in C
Episode No. 4 (1983) for tenor saxophone
Petite suite sérieuse pour concert de famille (1983) for piano
Episode No. 5 (1983) for cello
Episode No. 6 (1984) for viola
Episode No. 7 "night away" (1984) for electric guitar
Episode No. 8 (1984) for double bass
Tango Si (1984) for piano
Une journee de Gadad, children's suite for piano (1984)
Signets, hommage à Maurice Ravel (1987) for piano
Episode No. 9 "Forte magnum colaraturum" (1990) for clarinet
Pièce pour piano (1997)
Petite Fantaisie for Leo (2001) for flute
Pièces jay (2001) for piano
O Bach! (2007) for piano
Leçons du petit jour (2007) for organ
3 x Toi (2018) for piano – dedicated to Nicolas Hodges

Chorus 
Mass (1945) for choir, soloists and orchestra
Motet I – To everything, there is a season (1947) for 7 women's voices
Madrigal (1948) for choir
Arbres (1950) for mixed choir a cappella
Et le reste à l'avenant (1950) for mixed choir a cappella
Everyone sings (1955) for double women's choir féminin et brass
Enfantillages (1956) for women's or children's choir in 3 equal voices
L'oeil égaré dans les plis de l'obéissance au vent, cantate radiophonique (1961) for soprano, contralto, baritone, mixed choir and orchestra
Dans la chaleur vacante, cantate radiophonique (1963) for choir and orchestra
Mots (1963) for vocal quintet and ensemble
Motet II (1965) for chorus and ensemble
Diurnes (1970) for mixed chorus of 12 to 72 voices
Sonata for 12 mixed voices a cappella (1970)
Perriault le déluné, comédie-madrigal for mixed choir of 3 times 4 voices a cappella (1993)
Für Celia affettuoso (1998) for choir in 6 voices
Motet III "Hunc igitur terrorem" (1999) for 5 solo voices, choir and Baroque orchestra
Enfantillages (2000) new version with flute and women's or children's choir
Autres enfantillages (2000) for children's or women's choir with clarinet ad libitum
Chant dormant (2001) for choir
Concerto-Fantaisie "O night, oh" (2001) – for mixed choir of 32 voices and concertante piano
Motet IV "Ventosum Vocant" (2002) for soprano and quintet
Femme en son jardin (2010) for vocal quartet, viola, cello and piano
Orça for choir a cappella
Savez-Vous Qui Est Mon Ami for chorus of three mixed voices

Vocal
Plupart du temps I, 6 melodies for mezzo-soprano and piano (1949)
Chansons pour Paule (1951) for mezzo-soprano and piano
Cinq poèmes de Jacques Dupin (1959) for soprano et piano or orchestra
Mots (1963) for soprano and ensemble
Quartet No. 2 (1964) for soprano and string trio
Mon Ami (1974) for voice and piano
Caprice for one voice (1975) for any male or female voice and piano, without pianist
Caprice for two voices (1978) for mezzo-soprano and counter-tenor or contralto
Liring Ballade (1980) for baritone and orchestra
Plupart du temps II (1989) for tenor, tenor saxophone and cello
Sigrancia-Ballade (1995) for baritone and orchestra
Lovaby, concert aria from the opera Schliemann (2000) for soprano and orchestra
Titivillus (2000) for mezzo-soprano, flute and piano or 2 flutes and piano
Motet IV "Ventosum Vocant" (2002) for soprano, flute, clarinet, harp, violin and cello.
L' Ascension du Mont Ventoux (2004) for soprano, narrator, flute, clarinet, violin, cello and harp
D'un journal d'amour for soprano and viola (2009)
Sur do: Hommage à Purcell pour quatuor vocal, alto et violoncelle (2010)
Rambles for narrator/speaker, flute, clarinet, harp, violin and cello
L'oeil égaré for baritone and piano
Fredons for soprano and ensemble

Reworkings of early music
Heinrich Schütz / 8 Psaumes de Becker / No. 11 for string quartet, double bass, wind quintet, harp and piano or orchestra
Heinrich Schütz / 8 Psaumes de Becker / No. 20 for wind quintet, string trio, viola, harp or orchestra
Heinrich Schütz / 8 Psaumes de Becker / No. 47 for flute, clarinet, 2 violins, 2 violas and cello
Heinrich Schütz / 8 Psaumes de Becker / No. 68 for flute, clarinet, 2 violins, 2 violas and cello
Heinrich Schütz / 8 Psaumes de Becker / No. 84 for flute, bassoon, piano and string quartet
Heinrich Schütz / 8 Psaumes de Becker / No. 92 for oboe, clarinet, bassoon, horn and string quartet or orchestra
Heinrich Schütz / 8 Psaumes de Becker / No. 97 for wind quintet, string trio
Heinrich Schütz / 8 Psaumes de Becker / No. 121 for flute, piano and string quartet or orchestra
Lassus Ricercare (1970) for brass, percussion, harp and pianos
Orlandus Lassus / 3 Psaumes de Ulenberg
Pierluigi Palestrina / Assumpta est Maria motet, for flute, clarinet, harp and string trio
Guillaume Dufay / Flos Florum motet for wind quintet
Johannes Brasart / O Flos Fragrans motet for wind quintet
Josquin des Prés / Suite brèveJean Sébastien Bach / 14 Goldberg canons for flute, oboe, clarinet, string trio and double bassJean Sébastien Bach – Contrapunctus IV (The Art of Fugue)'' (2001) for chamber orchestra and vocal quartet

References

Jolas, Betsy